Symon Lovett is an Australian television personality and podcaster known for appearing alongside his friend Adam Densten on the Australian reality television program Gogglebox.

Television And podcast
Lovett started appearing as a main cast member on Gogglebox when it started. However, after the tenth season, he and Densten left the show but returned to the show for its fourteenth season. They have remained on the show since then.

In January 2021, Lovett and Densten appeared as contestants on the seventh season of I'm A Celebrity...Get Me Out Of Here!. They were the last celebrities to enter the jungle and Lovett was the third contestant to be eliminated.

Later that year, Lovett and Densten launched a podcast on LISTNR, called The Adam And Symon Show.

Appearances 
 Gogglebox Australia (2015-2019, 2021-)
 I’m A Celebrity…Get Me Out Of Here! Australia (2021)

References

Living people
Year of birth missing (living people)